Henricus Eduard Hubertus (Han) Meijer (born 15 May 1949 in Amsterdam) is a Dutch professor emeritus of Polymer Technology  in the Eindhoven University of Technology; he was formerly the scientific director  of the laboratory. His research interests include structure development during flow and structure-property relations, micro-rheology and microfluidics, micro-macro-mechanics, modelling of polymer processing and design in polymers.

Career
He received his MSc in mechanical engineering from the University of Twente in 1975, and his Ph.D degree from the same university in 1980. His thesis, "Melting in Single Screw Extruders: Models, Calculations, Screw Design", was done under the direction of J.F. Ingen Housz.  He then became a research scientist at  DSM research.  In 1985 he was appointed part-time professor at the department of Polymer Chemistry and Technology  at Eindhoven, and in 1989   became full professor in  Polymer Technology in the Fundamental Mechanics group of the department of Mechanical Engineering.

He was scientific director of  Eindhoven Polymer Laboratories from 2003 until his retirement on 1 May 2014. He was the PhD thesis advisor for more than 60 students, and published   over 200 peer-reviewed scientific articles.

Meijer was awarded the DSM Performance Materials Award 2010.

References

External links
Official biography
Official curriculum vitae

Scientists from Amsterdam
University of Twente alumni
Academic staff of the Eindhoven University of Technology
1949 births
Living people